The City of Greater Dandenong is a local government area in Victoria, Australia in the southeastern suburbs of Melbourne. It has an area of just under 130 square kilometres (50 sq mi) and 166,094 residents in 2018. 29% of its land area forms part of the South East Green Wedge. It was formed in 1994 by the merger of parts of the former City of Dandenong and City of Springvale.

The Bunurong/Boon Wurrung and Wurundjeri peoples are the traditional owners and custodians of the land on which Greater Dandenong is now located.

History
In 1994, the state government restructured local government in Victoria. The reforms dissolved 210 councils and created 78 new councils through amalgamations. As part of the reforms City of Springvale and City of Dandenong were merged to create City of Greater Dandenong.

Council
Greater Dandenong City Council comprises 11 councillors, elected from single member wards. Prior to 2020, councillors were elected from four wards: Lightwood, Paperbark, Red Gum and Silverleaf. Councillors are elected to fixed-four year terms in a proportional manner using the STV voting system, with each ward electing Councillors based on their respective population.

Elections are held every four years, in accordance with the Local Government Act 1989, with voting being compulsory. Voter turnout figures by the Victorian Electoral Commission show that 81.7% of eligible voters voted at the last council election in 2020.

Mayor
The mayor is the head of the municipality, leading and coordinating the council's work. The position of mayor is a mostly ceremonial one, expected to represent the City and act as its public spokesperson. The mayor is not entirely a figurehead, however, instead being tasked with chairing council meetings and being involved with a greater number of community events such as citizenship ceremonies.

A mayor is elected among the councillors for a term of one year, meaning that each period between two local government elections usually sees four mayorships. Clare O'Neil became the youngest female mayor in Australian history when she served as Mayor of Greater Dandenong from 2003 to 2004.

Current composition

The composition of Greater Dandenong City Council is one of the most Labor-dominated in the state, demonstrated by its high percentage of councillors who are members of the party and its below-average number of independent councillors. This political membership is reflected through the local federal and state MPs, both of whom are ALP-affiliated. The most recent elections were held on 24 October 2020 and produced the following results:

Places of interest
 Dandenong Market
 Drum Theatre
 Heritage Hill Museum and Historic Gardens 
 City of Greater Dandenong Libraries

Townships and localities
The 2021 census, the city had a population of 158,208 up from 152,050 in the 2016 census

^ - Territory divided with another LGA

Sport
Dandenong Rangers play home games at the Dandenong Basketball Stadium and compete in the WNBL. Two championships have been won in the 2003–04 and 2004–05 seasons In the 2005-2006 and the 2016-2017 seasons, the team reached the Grand Final only to lose to the Canberra Capitals and Sydney Uni Flames respectively.

Dandenong Thunder compete in the Victorian Premier League, playing at George Andrews Reserve. In 2012, the team claimed the famous treble of the Victorian Premier League championship, the Victorian Premier League Minor Premiership, and the Football Federation Victoria State Knockout Cup.

The Greater Dandenong Warriors Hockey Club is based at the Bill Toon Playing fields on Cleeland Road, Dandenong North. The club currently fields four men's teams, one women's team, five junior teams and three master teams.

Community groups

Greater Dandenong has many active community groups.

Service clubs include the Lions Club of Greater Dandenong, the Lions Club of Dandenong, the Lions Club of Dandenong (Supper), the Rotary Club of Dandenong, the Rotary Club of Noble Park and the Rotary Club of Springvale.

Schools
The City of Greater Dandenong has a sister city relationship with Xuzhou, a city in China. Due to this connection the following schools in Greater Dandenong have established relationships with schools in Xuzhou:

 Wallarano Primary School and Minzulu
 Coomoora Secondary College & Xuzhou No. 3 Middle School
 Springvale Primary School & Xuzhou Arts School
 Maralinga Primary School & Jinshinqaun
 Noble Park English Language School & Xinyi Middle School
 Springvale Secondary College & Xuzhou No.1 Middle School

See also
 List of places on the Victorian Heritage Register in the City of Greater Dandenong

References

External links
 
Official website
Metlink local public transport map
Link to Land Victoria interactive maps
Local Government & Municipal Knowledge Base
Victorian Electoral Commission – Greater Dandenong City Council profile

Local government areas of Melbourne
Greater Melbourne (region)